The 1986 All Japan Endurance Championship was the fourth season of the All Japan Sports Prototype Championship. The 1986 champion was the #1 Advan Alpha Nova Porsche 962C driven by Kunimitsu Takahashi.

Schedule
All races were held in Japan.

Season results
Season results are as follows:

Point Ranking

Drivers

References

External links
 1985 全日本耐久レース選手権 

JSPC seasons
All Japan Endurance
All Japan Endurance